WFSE (88.9 FM), known as Fighting Scots Radio, is a college radio station at PennWest Edinboro in Edinboro, Pennsylvania, United States. The station broadcasts from Compton Hall on the university campus, and transmits from a facility located just off the on-ramp for I-79 South in Edinboro.

It features a broad rock format which includes alternative and indie artists, along with specialty shows highlighting live sports, sports talk, news, and other musical genres. The station is student-led, assisted by a faculty advisor.

History

WFSE has served the campus and community since 1978 and streams 24/7 worldwide at edinboronow.com, the online hub for all of the university's campus media, also including The Spectator (newspaper) and ETV (television station). Staffing is open to all majors, with positions available both on and off the air. In addition, there are a limited number of practicum opportunities for students in management roles.

Inspiration for the station was provided by Dr. Gary Christiansen (since retired), who was instrumental in its initial formation and provided guidance for over a decade. Numerous past and recent staff members have graduated to successful careers both within and outside of the media. The first student General Manager, John Evans, later represented the 5th district as a member of the Pennsylvania House of Representatives from 2001–2013.  Sean Peebles, a 1996 alumnus, is a former General Manager, and is currently the public address announcer of the Cleveland Cavaliers.

Transmitter

One item of note is the station's transmitter facility.  Unlike most stations that broadcast from a self-supporting or guyed tower specially designed for broadcast use, WFSE's signal radiates from a repurposed sign frame at a former truck stop at the intersection of US 6N and the I-79 southbound on-ramp.  The tri-bay transmitting antenna is affixed to one side of the frame, while the studio-transmitter link receiver is on the other.

References

External links
WFSE Radio Facebook

FSE
FSE
Radio stations established in 1979
Edinboro University of Pennsylvania